Criticism of Microsoft has followed various aspects of its products and business practices. Issues with ease of use, robustness, and security of the company's software are common targets for critics. In the 2000s, a number of malware mishaps targeted security flaws in Windows and other products. Microsoft was also accused of locking vendors and consumers in to their products, and of not following or complying with existing standards in its software. Total cost of ownership comparisons between Linux and Microsoft Windows are a continuous point of debate.

The company has been the subject of numerous lawsuits, brought by several governments and by other companies, for unlawful monopolistic practices. In 2004, the European Union found Microsoft guilty in the Microsoft Corp. v. Commission case, and it received an 899 million euro fine.

Ties to US Government departments 
On September 14, 2019, Microsoft's flagship store was shut down by protestors as part of a direct action organized by Close the Camps NYC. The action was in response to Microsoft's $19.4 million contract with U.S. Immigration and Customs Enforcement (ICE). Microsoft's relationship with the immigration enforcement agency was revealed by executive Tom Keane, through a company blog post that describes ICE's use of the company's high-security cloud storage product Azure Government. He went on to say the company is "proud to support" the work of ICE. Microsoft has stated it "is not working with the U.S. government on any projects related to separating children from their families at the border."

In February 2019, some of Microsoft employees protested the company's war profiteering from a $480 million contract to develop augmented reality headsets for the United States Army.

Vendor lock-in 
From its inception, Microsoft defined itself as a platform company and understood the importance of attracting third-party programmers. It did so by providing development tools, training, access to proprietary APIs in early versions, and partner programs. Although the resulting ubiquity of Microsoft software allows a user to benefit from network effects, critics and even Microsoft itself decry what they consider to be an "embrace, extend and extinguish" strategy of adding proprietary features to open standards or their software implementations, thereby using its market dominance to gain unofficial ownership of standards "extended" in this way.

Microsoft software is also presented as a "safe" choice for IT managers purchasing software systems. In an internal memo for senior management Microsoft's head of C++ development, Aaron Contorer, stated:

More recently, Microsoft had their OOXML specification approved by the ISO standards body in a manner consistent with previous attempts to control standards.

With the release of Windows 8, Microsoft began requiring OEM devices to ship with UEFI system firmware, configured by default to only allow the execution of operating system binaries digitally signed by Microsoft (UEFI secure boot). Concerns were raised that this requirement would hinder the use of alternate operating systems such as Linux. In a post discussing secure boot on the Building Windows 8 blog, Microsoft developer Tony Mangefeste indicated that vendors would provide means to customize secure boot, stating that "At the end of the day, the customer is in control of their PC. Microsoft's philosophy is to provide customers with the best experience first, and allow them to make decisions themselves." As such, vendors were required to provide means for users to re-configure or disable secure boot (although devices running Windows RT, a variation of Windows 8 for ARM architecture, have locked firmware where this cannot be disabled). No mandate is made regarding the installation of third-party certificates that would enable running alternative programs.

Copyright enforcement 
When Microsoft discovered that its first product, Altair BASIC, was subject to widespread unauthorized copying, Microsoft founder Bill Gates wrote an Open Letter to Hobbyists that openly accused many hobbyists of stealing software. Gates' letter provoked many responses, with some hobbyists objecting to the broad accusation, and others supporting the principle of compensation.
This disagreement over whether software should be proprietary continues into the present day under the banner of the free software movement, with Microsoft characterizing free software released under the terms of the GPL as being "potentially viral" and the GNU General Public License itself as a "viral license" which "infects" proprietary software and forces its developer to have to release proprietary source to the public.

The Halloween documents, internal Microsoft memos which were leaked to the open source community beginning in 1998, indicate that some Microsoft employees perceive "open source" software — in particular, Linux — as a growing long-term threat to Microsoft's position in the software industry. The Halloween documents acknowledged that parts of Linux are superior to the versions of Microsoft Windows available at the time, and outlined a strategy of "de-commoditize[ing] protocols & applications."
Microsoft stated in its 2006 Annual Report that it was a defendant in at least 35 patent infringement lawsuits. The company's litigation expenses for April 2004 through March 2007 exceed $4.3 billion: over $4 billion in payouts, plus $300 million in legal fees.

Another concern of critics is that Microsoft may be using the distribution of shared source software to harvest names of developers who have been exposed to Microsoft code, as some believe that these developers could someday be the target of lawsuits if they were ever to participate in the development of competing products. This issue is addressed in published papers from several organizations including the American Bar Association and the Open Source Initiative.

Starting in the 1990s, Microsoft was accused of maintaining "hidden" or "secret" APIs: interfaces to its operating system software that it deliberately keeps undocumented to gain a competitive advantage in its application software products.
Microsoft employees have consistently denied this;
they claim that application developers inside and outside Microsoft routinely reverse-engineered DOS and 16-bit versions of Windows without any inside help, creating legacy support problems that far exceeded any alleged benefit to Microsoft.
In response to court orders, Microsoft has published interfaces between components of its operating system software, including components like Internet Explorer, Active Directory, and Windows Media that sell as part of Windows but compete with application software.

On October 10, 2018, Microsoft joined the Open Invention Network community despite holding more than 60,000 patents.

Mono patent concerns 

On July 6, 2009, Microsoft announced that it was placing their ECMA 334 and ECMA 335 specifications under their Community Promise pledging that they would not assert their patents against anyone implementing, distributing, or using alternative implementations of .NET. Mono's implementation of those components of the .NET stack not submitted to the ECMA for standardization has been the source of patent violation concerns for much of the life of the project. In particular, discussion has taken place about whether Microsoft could destroy the Mono project through patent suits.

The base technologies submitted to the ECMA, and therefore also the Unix/GNOME-specific parts, are claimed to be safe due to Microsoft's explicitly placing both ECMA 334 (C#) and ECMA 335 (CLI) standards under the Microsoft Community Promise. The concerns primarily relate to technologies developed by Microsoft on top of the .NET Framework, such as ASP.NET, ADO.NET and Windows Forms (see non-standardized namespaces), i.e. parts composing Mono's Windows compatibility stack. These technologies are today not fully implemented in Mono and not required for developing Mono-applications, they are simply there for developers and users who need full compatibility with the Windows system.

In June 2009 the Ubuntu Technical Board stated that it saw "no reason to exclude Mono or applications based upon it from the archive, or from the default installation set."

The Free Software Foundation's Richard Stallman has stated on June 2, 2009, that "[...]we should discourage people from writing programs in C#. Therefore, we should not include C# implementations in the default installation of GNU/Linux distributions or in their principal ways of installing GNOME". On July 1, 2009, Brett Smith (also from the FSF) stated that "Microsoft's patents are much more dangerous: it's the only major software company that has declared itself the enemy of GNU/Linux and stated its intention to attack our community with patents.", "C# represents a unique threat to us" and "The Community Promise does nothing to change any of this".

Fedora Project Leader Paul Frields has stated, "We do have some serious concerns about Mono and we'll continue to look at it with our legal counsel to see what if any steps are needed on our part", yet "We haven't come to a legal conclusion that is pat enough for us to make the decision to take mono out".

In November 2011 at an Ubuntu Developer Summit, developers voted to have the Mono-based Banshee media player removed from Ubuntu's default installation beginning on Ubuntu 12.04; although reported reasonings included performance issues on ARM architecture, blocking issues on its GTK+ 3 version, and it being, in their opinion, "not well maintained", speculation also surfaced that the decision was also influenced by a desire to remove Mono from the base distribution, as the remaining programs dependent on Mono, gbrainy and Tomboy, were also to be removed. Mono developer Joseph Michael Shields defended the performance of Banshee on ARM, and also the claims that Banshee was not well-maintained as being a "directed personal insult" to one of its major contributors.

Ignoring unauthorized copying 

Microsoft ignored unauthorized copying of its own software for their benefit on the long term. While talking about users in China who don't pay for the software they use in 2006, to an audience at the University of Washington, Bill Gates said "And as long as they're going to steal it, we want them to steal ours. They'll get sort of addicted, and then we'll somehow figure out how to collect sometime in the next decade."

The practice allowed Microsoft to gain some dominance over the Chinese market and only then taking measures against unauthorized copies. In 2008, by means of the Windows update mechanism, a verification program called "Windows Genuine Advantage" (WGA) was downloaded and installed. When WGA detects that the copy of Windows is not genuine, it periodically turns the user's screen black. This behavior angered users and generated complaints in China with a lawyer stating that "Microsoft uses its monopoly to bundle its updates with the validation programs and forces its users to verify the genuineness of their software".

Licensing agreements 

A common complaint comes from those who want to purchase a computer that usually comes preinstalled with Windows without a copy of Windows pre-installed and without paying extra for the license either so that another operating system can be used or because a license was already acquired elsewhere, such as through the MSDN Academic Alliance program. Microsoft encourages original equipment manufacturers (OEMs) to supply computers with Windows pre-installed by presenting their dominance in computer sales and arguing that consumers benefit by not having to install an operating system. Because the price of the license varies depending on discounts given to the OEM and because there is no similar computer that the OEM offers without Windows, there is no immediate way to find the size of the refund.  In 2009, Microsoft stated that it has always charged OEMs about $50 for a Windows license on a $1,000 computer.

While it is possible to obtain a computer with no or free operating systems, virtually all large computer vendors continue to bundle Microsoft Windows with the majority of the personal computers in their ranges. The claimed increase in the price of a computer resulting from the inclusion of a Windows license has been called the "Windows tax" or "Microsoft tax" by opposing computer users. The Findings of Fact in the United States Microsoft antitrust case of 1998 established that "One of the ways Microsoft combats piracy is by advising OEMs that they will be charged a higher price for Windows unless they drastically limit the number of PCs that they sell without an operating system pre-installed. In 1998, all major OEMs agreed to this restriction." Microsoft also once assessed license fees based on the number of computers an OEM sold, regardless of whether a Windows license was included; Microsoft was forced to end this practice due to a consent decree. In 2010, Microsoft stated that its agreements with OEMs to distribute Windows are nonexclusive, and OEMs are free to distribute computers with a different operating system or without any operating system.

Microsoft does not provide refunds for Windows licenses sold through an OEM, including licenses that come with the purchase of a computer or are pre-installed on a computer.

According to Microsoft's End User License Agreement for Windows 7 the ability to receive a refund for the operating system is determined by the hardware manufacturer: Acer Inc. has a policy of requiring the customer to return items at their own expense, and the balance received by the customer can be as low as €30. In other cases, vendors have asked that customers requesting refunds sign non-disclosure agreements.

Older versions of Microsoft Windows had different license terms with respect to the availability of a refund for Windows:  Based on the updated language, vendors refused to issue partial refunds for Windows licenses, requiring that the computer be returned altogether. In some countries, this practice has been ruled a violation of consumer protection law.

Additionally, the EULA for Windows Vista was criticized for being too restrictive.

Litigation 

Microsoft's market dominance and business practices have attracted widespread resentment, which is not necessarily restricted to the company's competitors. In a 2003 publication, Dan Geer argued the prevalence of Microsoft products has resulted in a monoculture which is dangerously easy for viruses to exploit.

Labor practices 

Microsoft has been criticized for the use of permatemp employees (employees employed for years as "temporary," and therefore without medical benefits), use of forced retention tactics, where departing employees would be sued to prevent departure, as well as more traditional cost-saving measures, ranging from cutting medical benefits to not providing towels in company locker rooms.

Historically, Microsoft has also been accused of overworking employees, in many cases, leading to burnout within just a few years of joining the company. The company is often referred to as a "Velvet Sweatshop", a term which originated in a 1989 Seattle Times article, and later became used to describe the company by some of Microsoft's own employees. This characterization is derived from the perception that Microsoft provides nearly everything for its employees in a convenient place, but in turn overworks them to a point where it would be bad for their (possibly long-term) health. For example, the kitchenettes have free beverages and many buildings include exercise rooms and showers. However, the company has been accused of attempting to keep employees at the company for unreasonably long hours and working them too much. This is detailed in several books about Microsoft, including Hard Drive: Bill Gates and the Making of the Microsoft Empire.

A US state lawsuit was brought against Microsoft in 1992 representing 8,558 current and former employees that had been classified as "temporary" and "freelance", and became known as Vizcaino v. Microsoft. In 1993, the suit became a US Federal Class Action in the United States District Court Western District Of Washington at Seattle as No. C93-178C. The Final Settlement came in 2005. The case was decided on the (IRS-defined) basis that such "permatemps" had their jobs defined by Microsoft, worked alongside regular employees doing the same work, and worked for long terms. After a series of court setbacks including three reversals on appeal, Microsoft settled the suit for US$97 million.

A side effect of the "permatemp" lawsuit is that now contract employees are prevented from participating in team morale events and other activities that could be construed as making them "employees". They are also limited to 18-month contracts and must leave after that time for 6 months before returning under contract.

Microsoft is the largest American corporate user of H-1B guest worker visas and has joined other large technology companies like Google in recently lobbying for looser H-1B visa restrictions.

Jesse Jackson believes Microsoft should hire more minorities and women. Jackson has urged other companies to diversify their workforce. He believes that Microsoft made some progress when it appointed two women to its board of directors in 2015.

Advertising and public relations 
Critics have alleged that Microsoft has used funding to drum up support from think tanks and trade organizations such as the Alexis de Tocqueville Institution (AdTI), the Independent Institute, and Americans for Technology Leadership (ATL). During the antitrust case United States v. Microsoft, ATL sent a poll to 19 state attorneys general purporting to show that "the public believes state AGs should devote their energy to causes other than Microsoft". Also during the case the Independent Institute ran full-page advertisements in The New York Times and The Washington Post defending Microsoft, which was later revealed to have funded the ad campaign. The institute published Winners, Losers, and Microsoft: Competition and Antitrust in High Technology shortly thereafter.

In June 2002, the AdTI published a report, quickly pulled under the argument that it was a draft version, which contained criticism of the copyleft model and the GNU General Public License. A May 2002 press release for the report stated that it would contain arguments suggesting that governments could be threatened by hackers and terrorists (who could study potential vulnerabilities due to source availability) if it used open source software. However, the draft contained no references to these topics. Open Source Initiative (OSI) founder Bruce Perens felt that the report had "Microsoft's paws all over [it]". Microsoft argued that its funding was for AdTI's operations as a whole, and not relevant to any specific research by the organization.

"Champagne", a 2002 British television advert for the Xbox, received 136 complaints from viewers to the Independent Television Commission (ITC) over its content. The advert featured a newborn baby being launched out of its mother—aging as it flies through the air, and crashing into a gravestone. It contained the tagline "Life is short, play more." The advert was banned from television by the ITC, who considered it to be "offensive, shocking and in bad taste", noting complaints citing the advert's themes of death and the "traumatic experience" the person was facing in the ad.

In August 2004, the Advertising Standards Authority (ASA) ordered Microsoft to pull ads in Britain that claimed that the total cost of ownership of Linux servers was ten times that of Windows Server 2003. The comparison included the cost of hardware, and put Linux at a disadvantage by installing it on more expensive but poorer-performing hardware compared to that used for Windows.

On January 22, 2007, Rick Jelliffe made a claim on his blog that a Microsoft employee offered to pay him to make corrections in English Wikipedia articles concerning Office Open XML. Microsoft spokesperson Catherine Brooker expressed the belief that the article had been "heavily written" by IBM employees who supported the rival OpenDocument format, though she provided no specific evidence. Internet entrepreneur and Wikimedia Foundation founder Jimmy Wales described Microsoft's offer as unethical.

In 2009, it was found that a photo on the Polish version of Microsoft's business productivity website—which depicted three people of various races during an office meeting—had been edited to replace the head of an African-American man with that of a Caucasian, whilst also failing to edit the person's hand to match the different skin color. Microsoft apologized and quickly removed the image.

In 2011, Moneylife.in alleged that two "anonymous comments boosting their product"—one by a Nokia employee and another by a Microsoft employee—were posted on their review of Nokia Lumia 800, which was based only on the "technical specifications" and the reviewer "hadn't laid a finger on the phone". In conclusion, Charles Arthur argued "Nobody has come out of the episode looking good. Sapkale was accused of breaking his own site's privacy policy by posting the IP and email addresses of the commenters, while the commenting duo's failure to declare any interest looked, at best, like astroturfing."

In 2014 details on a partnership between Machinima.com and Microsoft came to light regarding a marketing campaign for Xbox One. Machinima would offer some of its users $3 per thousand views if the user showed 30 seconds of an Xbox One game and mentioned the system by name. Controversy arose when it was reported that, under the terms of the promotion, participants were not allowed to disclose that they were being paid for said endorsements, which Ars Technica said conflicted with FTC regulations requiring recipients to fully disclose when such actions occur. Machinima stated that the confidentiality clause only applied to the terms of the agreement, and not to the existence of the agreement, and Microsoft ended the promotion and directed Machinima to add disclosures to the videos involved. In September 2015, Machinima settled with the FTC over charges that the ad campaign failed to comply with FTC endorsement guidelines; the FTC decided not to take action against Microsoft since it already has "policies and procedures designed to prevent such lapses".

Tax avoidance 

As reported by several news outlets, an Irish subsidiary of Microsoft based in the Republic of Ireland declared £220 bn in profits but paid no corporation tax for the year 2020. This is due to the company being tax resident in Bermuda as mentioned in the accounts for 'Microsoft Round Island One', a subsidiary that collects licence fees from the use of Microsoft software worldwide. Dame Margaret Hodge, a Labour MP in the UK said, "It is unsurprising – yet still shocking – that massively wealthy global corporations openly, unashamedly and blatantly refuse to pay tax on the profits they make in the countries where they undertake business".

In 2020, ProPublica reported that the company had diverted more than $39 billion in U.S. profits to Puerto Rico using a mechanism structured to make it seem as if the company was unprofitable on paper. As a result, the company paid a tax rate on those profits of "nearly 0%." When the Internal Revenue Service audited these transactions, ProPublica reported that Microsoft aggressively fought back, including successfully lobbying Congress to change the law to make it harder for the agency to conduct audits of large corporations.

Blacklisting of journalists 
John C. Dvorak said that in the 1980s, Microsoft classified journalists as "Okay", "Sketchy", or "Needs work" and targeted "Needs work" journalists in an attempt to have them terminated.  Dvorak said that he was denied information about Windows because he was on a blacklist. Mary Jo Foley stated that she was denied interviews with Microsoft personnel for several years following the publication of a story based on a memo describing the number of bugs in Windows 2000 at release.

Censorship in China  
Microsoft (along with Google, Yahoo, Cisco, AOL, Skype, and other companies) has cooperated with the Chinese government in implementing a system of Internet censorship. Human rights advocates such as Human Rights Watch and media groups such as Reporters Without Borders criticized the companies, noting for example that it is "ironic that companies whose existence depends on freedom of information and expression have taken on the role of censor."

Bing censorship of the 1989 Tiananmen Square massacre 

On June 4, 2021, the 32nd anniversary of the 1989 Tiananmen Square massacre, searches for the Tank Man image and videos were censored by Microsoft Bing search engine worldwide. Hours after Microsoft acknowledged the issue, the search returned only pictures of tanks elsewhere in the world. Search engines that license results from Microsoft such as DuckDuckGo and Yahoo faced similar issues. Microsoft said the issue was "due to an accidental human error."

The director of Human Rights Watch, Kenneth Roth, said he found the idea it was an inadvertent error "hard to believe". David Greene, Civil Liberties Director at Electronic Frontier Foundation, said that content moderation was impossible to do perfectly and "egregious mistakes are made all the time", but he further elaborated that "At worst, this was purposeful suppression at the request of a powerful state."

Privacy issues

Collaboration with the NSA on internet surveillance 

Microsoft was the first company to participate in the PRISM surveillance program, according to leaked NSA documents obtained by The Guardian and The Washington Post in June 2013, and acknowledged by government officials following the leak. The program authorizes the government to secretly access data of non-US citizens hosted by American companies without a warrant.  Microsoft has denied participation in such a program.

In July 2013, The Guardian elaborated that leaked documents show that:
 Microsoft helped the NSA to circumvent its encryption to intercept web chats on Outlook.com and gave it unencrypted access to Outlook.com and Hotmail email.
 Microsoft provided the NSA with access to users' data on its cloud storage service OneDrive (formerly SkyDrive).
 After Microsoft bought Skype, the NSA tripled the number of Skype video calls being collected through PRISM.
In a statement, Microsoft said that they "provide customer data only in response to legal processes."

Telemetry and data collection 
Windows 10 was criticized on-launch for having default settings that send various information regarding user behaviors to Microsoft and its "trusted partners", such as data regarding user contacts and calendar events, location data and history, "telemetry" (diagnostics data); this could not be fully disabled on non-enterprise versions of Windows 10), an "advertising ID", as well as further data when the Cortana assistant is enabled in full.

Microsoft faced criticism from France's data protection commission and the European Union for its practices in regards to Windows 10. On subsequent iterations of the OS, Microsoft has clarified its data collection policies, and made its out-of-box experience provide clearer information on Windows privacy settings, and the effects they have on the overall user experience. Microsoft also simplified its "telemetry" options to only consist of "Basic" and "Full" modes, and reduced the amount of system information collected in "Basic" mode.

In November 2018, the Dutch government issued a report stating that telemetry implementations in Office 365 violated the EU General Data Protection Regulation (GDPR). In July 2019 the company tasked with investigating the privacy risks reported that Microsoft had adequately addressed these issues in Office 365 ProPlus, while the other concerns still remained.

Robot journalism
In May 2020, Microsoft announced that a number of its MSN contract journalists would be replaced by robot journalism leading to criticism about which stories would be displayed and their quality.

Xbox Live prohibition on use of the word "gay" 
Microsoft has come under some criticism for its attitude to homosexuality and Xbox Live. Users may not use the string "gay" in a gamertag (even in a non-homosexual context, for example as part of a surname), or refer to homosexuality in their profile (including self-identifying as such), as the company considers this "content of a sexual nature" or "offensive" to other users and therefore unsuitable for the service. After banning 'Teresa', a lesbian gamer who had been harassed by other users for being a homosexual, a senior Xbox Live team member, Stephen Toulouse, has clarified the policy, stating that "Expression of any sexual orientation [...] is not allowed in gamertags" but that they are "examining how we can provide it in a way that won't get misused". GLAAD weighed in on the controversy as well, supporting the steps that Microsoft has taken over the years to engage the LGBT community.

Xbox Live subscription price increase 
On January 22, 2021, Microsoft announced that the pricing model for Xbox Live subscriptions would be increasing across each price tier, with a year of the service doubling from US$60 to US$120 for users. The move was met with widespread criticism from users and news media, with speculation that the change was meant to make the Xbox Game Pass subscription more enticing. In response to the backlash, on the same day that the price increase was announced, Microsoft reversed the decision to increase the price of Xbox Live.

ANS patent controversy 
Asymmetric numeral systems is widely used family of method in data compression, whose author gave it to public domain - wanting to be unrestricted by the patent system, also successfully defending from patent by Google. In June 2019 Microsoft lodged a patent application called 'Features of range asymmetric number system encoding and decoding'. The USPTO issued a final rejection of the application on October 27, 2020. Yet on March 2, 2021, Microsoft gave a USPTO explanatory filing stating "The Applicant respectfully disagrees with the rejections, seeking to overturn the final rejection under the "After Final Consideration Pilot 2.0" program. The application is currently still pending, as USPTO has not confirmed if it will allow the rejection appeal to proceed.

Xinjiang region 

In 2020, the Australian Strategic Policy Institute accused at least 82 major brands of being connected to forced Uyghur labor in Xinjiang. Microsoft is reported as being supplied by three Chinese factories employing Uyghur and Xinjiang workers.

See also 
Criticism of other software companies:
 Criticism of Facebook
 Criticism of Apple
 Criticism of Google
 Criticism of Yahoo!

General mechanisms at work:
 Path dependence
 Embrace, extend and extinguish
 Network effect
 Vendor lock-in
 Appeal to fear
 Fear, uncertainty and doubt

References

Further reading 
 Charles, John. "Indecent proposal? Doing Business With Microsoft". IEEE Software. January/February 1998. pp.113–117.
 Clark, Jim with Owen Edwards. Netscape Time: The Making of the Billion Dollar Start-up That Took on Microsoft. New York, Saint Martin's Press, 1999
 Cusumano, Michael A.; Selby, Richard W. Microsoft Secrets: How the World's Most Powerful Software Company Creates Technology, Shapes Markets and Manages People. New York: Free Press, 1995.
 Edstrom, Jennifer; Eller, Marlin. Barbarians Led by Bill Gates: Microsoft from inside: How the World's Richest Corporation Wields its Power . N.Y. Holt, 1998.
 

 Lemos, Robert. (2003). U.S. funds study of tech monocultures. Retrieved December 20, 2003, from https://web.archive.org/web/20110810000229/http://news.cnet.com/2100-7355-5111905.html
 Moody, Fred. I Sing the Body Electronic: A Year With Microsoft on the Multimedia Frontier. New York: Viking, 1995.
 National Science Foundation. (2003). Taking Cues from Mother Nature to Foil Cyber Attacks. Retrieved December 20, 2003, from https://www.nsf.gov/od/lpa/news/03/pr03130.htm
 Groklaw portal on Microsoft litigation Microsoft Litigation

External links 
Discussions of Microsoft's business practices:
 Microsoft's Sacred Cash Cow (Seattle Weekly)
 CNN.com – Microsoft: Flaw left millions at risk (Flaw Discovered by Faisal Danka)
 http://www.usdoj.gov/atr/cases/f3800/msjudgex.htm
 Dissecting Microsoft – Analyzes Microsoft's business practices and software
  "The Microsoft Tax" – by The Linux Information Project (LINFO)
 FAQ on the Microsoft Antitrust case by The Center for the Advancement of Capitalism
 Novell/SuSE Response to Steve Ballmer's Letter to the Linux Community

TCO:
 Bozman, Jean; Gillen, Al; Kolodgy, Charles; Kusnetzky, Dan; Perry, Randy; & Shiang, David (October 2002). "Windows 2000 Versus Linux in Enterprise Computing: An assessment of business value for selected workloads". IDC, sponsored by Microsoft Corporation. White paper.
 In an article published by BusinessWeek, Dan Kusnetzky suggests that the study was stacked against Linux.
 Study: Linux Is Still Cheaper Than Windows (PCworld.com) 

Tax evasion:
 Tax evasion by Microsoft in India

User feedback:
 An IT Professional's Testimonial of Microsoft software downfalls

Related media 
Gartner: Windows collapsing under own weight